Hannah Claus (born February 7, 1969) is a multidisciplinary visual artist of English and Kanien'kehá:ka (Mohawk) ancestries and is a member of the Mohawks of the Bay of Quinte First Nation.

Claus' installations produce sensory environments that highlight time, place, and elements and her artwork explores the complexities of themes such as community, identity, modernization, and relationships.

Biography 
Hannah Claus was born on February 7, 1969, in Fredericton, New Brunswick, Canada and spent her childhood in Saint John, New Brunswick. Her grandmother is of Mohawk descent and Claus was raised to think and identify herself as both Mohawk and European. In 2001, Claus moved to Montreal, Quebec, with her two children.

She is the Vice-President of the Aboriginal Curatorial Collective Board, which is an indigenous run and led non-profit organization that supports and connects artists, curators, and writers together. Claus also spends her time as the Chair of the Organizing Committee for the Montreal Arts Council. Claus has taught contemporary Indigenous art at Concordia University and is a sessional lecturer at the Kiuna Institute.

Claus is one of the co-founders of daphne, the first Indigenous  artist-run centre in Québec, along with Skawennati, Caroline Monnet and Nadia Myre.

Education 

Hannah Claus obtained her Associate's degree from the Ontario College of Art and Design with Honors in Toronto, Canada 1997. During a presentation for her "trade-treaty-territory" exhibition, Claus stated she studied both drawing and painting as well as sculpture. She has expressed her rejection of how art school only emphasizes concepts and ideas, not so much beauty. Still desiring the "aesthetic appeal of painting," she chose installation art as her practice instead. Claus went on to pursue her Masters of Fine Arts in Studio Arts at Concordia University in Montreal, Quebec, Canada in 2004.

Artworks  
"Trade is ceremony" (2019)
"Trade is ceremony" was displayed as part of Claus' "trade-treaty-territory" exhibition at the Dunlop Art Gallery in Regina, Saskatchewan. The art piece is composed of copper ball headpins and wool blanket.

Her inspiration is drawn from the illegible hand writing from the North West Company's registers and provides a view into the Indigenous world perspective during the early fur trade in the 1500s. Even as a French and English speaking woman, it was difficult for her to decipher the words and phrases denoted on each register. She emphasizes how arduous the task of trading must have been for her ancestors. Each art piece of the "trade-treaty-territory" exhibition highlights an element of the earth, and she depicts the element of fire by placing the copper lines in a "central fire-like form" radiating outward. Claus interacts with light, shadows, and "piece together an atemporal space critical of Western ideologies and systems." The artwork itself stands as a symbol of peace between the Indigenous nations and the French. Claus asks the viewers to "enact relations, exchange words and knowledge, and share resources, the foundations for peaceful coexistence."

"Words that are lasting" (2018)

In 2018, Hannah Claus was chosen as the creator of the Indigenous art installation contest at Queen's University Law building in Kingston, Ontario. The materials comprised in this artwork are translucent and frosted acrylic sheets, and this installation is the first time she has ever physically represented the wampum belt. Authentic wampum belts are created from tubular beads found from Atlantic coast seashells. The beaded belts were used primarily by the Indigenous peoples of the Eastern Woodlands "for ornamental, ceremonial, diplomatic, and commercial purposes." Her belts hang suspended from the ceiling of the MacDonald Hall atrium. Six of the belts are Haudenosaunee Confederacy belts: Everlasting Tree, Dish and One Spoon, Ojibwa Friendship, Old Fort, Council Fire and Kahswentha or Two Row. Claus invented the seventh belt to honor the Kanienkehá:ka, the Algonquin, and the Mississauga nations, and these nations inhabit the area of which the University stands. Claus illuminates the symbol of peace, coexistence, and agreement through this installation. Her artwork is meant to be reflected to the University law students, faculty, and staff as a reminder of history and to value these "living" treaties.

"Water song" (2014)

"Water song" is a suspended installation piece apart of the group exhibition "Inaabiwin" in the Ottawa Art Gallery, Ontario. In Anishnaabemowin, inaabiwin means “movement of light," and Claus captures this through her thin acetate discs moving slowly to reflect the light. This artwork is an installation, meaning the art dominates the space it resides in. "Water song" is composed of digital print on acetate, thread, PVA glue, and plexiglass. Suspended from the ceiling hang threads holding the thin acetate discs that contain images of rivers, branches, and other pictures of nature on them. Her inspiration is drawn from the relationships with the rivers that flow through the Miami Tribe, the Gesgapegia’jg, Getnig, Tlapataqanji’jg, and Sipug. The installation's shape is meant to mimic the sound waves of a traditional Mi'kmaw water song, that "gives thanks for the rivers and oceans." This traditional song was gifted to Claus by Tracey Metallic, Glenda Wysote-LaBillois and Victoria Labillois of Listuguj, all Pugwalesg singers. Claus also pays homage to the Haudenosaunee's wampum belt; she stresses the continuity and unification of rivers, similar to the coexistence principles and symbols of the wampum belt.

"Cloudscape" (2012)

"Cloudscape" is a suspended installation and solo exhibit at the Modern Fuel Artist-Run Centre, Ontario. The installation is created from reprographic film, thread, and PVA glue, and the process of the installation required three-dimensional programming. Claus' work reflects the Haudenosaunee creation story with the Sky-Woman. The Sky-Woman was a pregnant and celestial woman who fell from the Sky People, Karionake. She is responsible for the creation of human life on earth. The suspended white discs hang in cloud-like form, and are meant to mimic what the Sky-Woman's home must have looked like before she descended down to earth. The artist's "clouds" dominate the exhibit and enable the viewer to participate with the artwork by being surrounded and "destabilized" by it. The cloud-like forms stand to evoke community and creativity, and each individual white disc blend together to erect multiple massive clouds. Critic Justin Santelli from the Queen's University Journal claims Claus' work as an "incredibly unique piece, and it deserves your attention."

Exhibitions 
Solo exhibitions:

"Trade-treaty-territory," Dunlop Sherwood Gallery Regina, Saskatchewan, Canada Jan 17-Mar 13 2020 
 "There's a reason for our connection," McCord Museum, Montreal, Quebec Mar 7-Aug 2019 
 
"Spatial codifications" YYZ Toronto, Ontario Sept. 28-Nov. 30, 2019
"Earth. sea. sky. constellations for my relations" MAI (Montreal Arts Interculturels) Feb.15-Mar.17, 2018
"Hochelaga rock" McGill Campus Montreal, Quebec Oct. 21-Nov 19, 2017
"Akikpautik/kanatso" L’Imagier Art Centre, Gatineau, Quebec 2016
"Our minds are one" National Gallery of Canada, Ottawa Sept 20, 2014-Jan 4, 2015
"Cloudscape" Modern Fuel ARC, Ontario, Canada Jan 11, 2014-Feb 22, 2014
"Question de temps" Place Ville Marie, Montreal, Quebec 2013

Group exhibitions:

 "Àbadakone / Continuous Fire / Feu continuel" National Gallery of Canada, Ottawa, Ontario Nov 8, 2019- Apr 5, 2020
"Blurring the Line" Eiteljorg Museum, Indianapolis, Indiana, United States Nov. 16 to Feb. 2, 2019
 "Inaabiwin" Ottawa Art Gallery, Ottawa, Ontario Oct 4, 2019-Jan 19, 2020
 "Voices of the World" Montreal Museum of Fine Arts, Montreal, Quebec Sept 28-Nov 30 2019
 "AYEMIYEDAN NISIN (Dialogue 3)" Rouyn-Noranda Exhibition Center, Rouyn-Noranda, Quebec June 7-Sept 29, 2019
 "Undomesticated" Koffler Centre of the Arts, Toronto, Ontario Sept. 18-Nov. 2019
 "Red Embers," Allan Gardens Conservatory, Toronto, Ontario June 8-Oct 3, 20
"In/visible: Body as Reflective Site" Visual Arts Centre at the McClure Gallery, Montreal, Quebec June 7–29, 2019
"Territoire (Land)" Louise-et-Reuben-Cohen Art Gallery, Moncton, New Brunswick Oct. 25-Dec. 17 2017
"Reading the Talk" Robert McLaughlin Gallery, Oshawa, Ontario Sept. 20, 2014-Jan. 4, 2015
"Sentier art3" Belle Rivière Park, Mirabel, Quebec July 30-Aug 10, 2014

Collections 
Hannah Claus' work is included in:

 Allan Gardens Conservatory 
 Canada Council Art Bank 
 City of Montreal
 Department of Global Affairs
 Dunlop Art Gallery
 Eiteljorg Museum
 Koffler Centre of the Arts
 L’Imagier Art Centre
 McClure Gallery
 McCord Museum
 Museum of Art of Canada
 National Gallery of Canada
 Ottawa Art Gallery
 Place Ville Marie
 Robert McLaughlin Gallery
 Rouyn-Noranda Exhibition Center

Honors and awards 
In 2019, Hannah Claus was selected for the Eiteljorg Contemporary Art Fellowship. Claus and five other artists were chosen to receive a $25,000 award and produce a permanent collection for the Eiteljorg Museum of American Indians and Western Art. Claus was also selected for the Queen's University Law building art contest in Kingston, Ontario where she created the piece "Words that are lasting" in 2018.

Publications 

Rethinking Professionalism: Women and Art in Canada (1850) is a book by Kristina Huneault and Janice Anderson that features Hannah Claus. This in-depth study examines the changes "to the infrastructure of the art world" that has resulted in the "powerful discourse of professionalization" that erected in the 19th century. This book focuses on the history of women and art in Canada and celebrates the progress of female artists.
Inaabiwin (2018) is a catalog for the Inaabiwin exhibition at the Ottawa Art Gallery. This catalog stands as an introduction to the exhibition, and delves into the artists' interactions with colonization and navigation with Indigenous relationships with nature. Hannah Claus, Meryl McMaster, Greg Staats, Tanya Lukin Linklater, Scott Benesiinaabandan are the featured artists and "reclaim ways of being and knowing" after post-contact.
Reading the talk: Michael Belmore, Hannah Claus, Patricia Deadman, Keesic Douglas, Vanessa Dion Fletcher, Melissa General (2014) is a catalog explores the artworks from the "trade-treaty-territory" exhibition and how the art pieces in this exhibition explore distinct indigenous perspectives on the history of treaties" in Canada. Artists denote their interpersonal relationships, understandings of one another, as well as fundamental "Indigenous ontology."

See also 

 Native American Women in the arts 
 Visual Arts by indigenous peoples of the Americas
 List of Native American artists

References

External links 
Hannah Claus official website
"Trade is ceremony" image 
"Words that are lasting" image
"Water song" image
"Cloudscape" image

1969 births
Living people
Artists from New Brunswick
Canadian women artists
People from Fredericton
Canadian women curators
Mohawk people